Pleasure is a 1931 American pre-Code romantic drama film, directed by Otto Brower and starring Conway Tearle, Carmel Myers, and Frances Dade.

Cast
 Conway Tearle as Gerald Whitney
 Carmel Myers as Mrs. Dorothy Whitney
 Frances Dade as Joan Channing
 Paul Page as George Whitney
 Roscoe Karns as Arnie
 Lina Basquette as Helen
 Harold Goodwin as Lloyd
 Florence Lawrence as Martha
 Jack Byron as Allan Darrow
 George 'Gabby' Hayes as Motorcycle Cop

References

External links
Pleasure at the Internet Movie Database

1931 films
American romantic drama films
1931 romantic drama films
Films directed by Otto Brower
American black-and-white films
1930s American films